Espumas Flutuantes (Floating Foam) is an 1870 book of poems by Brazilian Romantic poet Castro Alves. It was the only work Alves published in his lifetime, because of his premature death from tuberculosis one year later. It is one of his most famous books, the other one being Os Escravos, published in 1883. Espumas Flutuantes was dedicated to Castro Alves' family, as seen in the book's "dedicatory". It has 53 poems, whose themes are mostly unrequited love, and odes such as "Ode ao dous de julho" and "O livro e a América".

References

Bibliography

External links
Espumas Flutuantes Online PDF . Instituto Federal de Educação, Ciência e Tecnologia. Retrieved 16 May 2017.

1870 books
Brazilian poetry collections
Romanticism